Monoxerutin is a flavonol, a type of flavonoid. It is more accurately a hydroxyethylrutoside.

References 

Quercetin glycosides
Flavonol rutinosides
Catechols
Phenol ethers